The Constitutional Court is the supreme authority on Burundi's constitutional law. The Constitutional Court deals with the interpretation of the Constitution of 2005 and is considered the country's second highest court. In conjunction with the Burundian Supreme Court (Cour Suprême), the Constitutional Court can sit en banc as a High Court of Justice (Haute Cour de Justice) with special prerogatives, such as the power to try an incumbent president. It sits at Bujumbura and its incumbent president is Charles Ndagijimana.

The court was established in 1992 as the authority on the new constitution adopted the same year. Previously, the Supreme Court had exercised jurisdiction over constitutional questions. In May 2015, the Constitutional Court was called to rule on the legality for a candidate to stand for a third term as president of Burundi. The case occurred against the background of the widespread popular unrest against the government of Pierre Nkurunziza who had held the position since 2005. The court ruled that the Constitution of 2005 did not prohibit a third term, ruling that Nkurunziza's first mandate should not be counted because he had been selected by parliament. The judgment was deeply controversial and was accused of pro-government bias. The court's vice-president, Sylvere Nimpagaritse, fled into exile before the judgment was released, claiming that the government had applied pressure to the judges to decide in favour of three-term presidencies. Nkurunziza subsequently served for a third term and died in 2020 shortly after announcing that he would not stand for a fourth. 

List of Presidents

 1992–1996: Gérard Niyungeko
 1996–1998: The Constitutional Court was abolished and then reorganized.
 1998–2006: Domitille Barancira
 2007–2013: Christine Nzeyimana
 2013–present: Charles Ndagijimana

See also

 Supreme Court of Burundi

References

External links
La Cour constitutionnelle du Burundi at Association des Cours Constitutionnelles ayant en Partage l'Usage du Français (ACCPUF)

Law of Burundi
Burundi
1992 establishments in Burundi
Courts and tribunals established in 1992